Cristina Yang, M.D., Ph.D., F.A.C.S. is a fictional character from the medical drama television series Grey's Anatomy, which has aired for over 16 years on the American Broadcasting Company (ABC) in the United States. The character was created by series producer Shonda Rhimes, and is portrayed by actress Sandra Oh. Introduced as a surgical intern at the fictional Seattle Grace Hospital, Yang worked her way up to resident level, eventually becoming a cardiothoracic surgical fellow, while her relationships with colleagues Meredith Grey (Ellen Pompeo), Izzie Stevens (Katherine Heigl), Alex Karev (Justin Chambers) and George O'Malley (T. R. Knight) formed a focal point of the series. Earlier in the series, Yang got engaged to Preston Burke (Isaiah Washington), in the past had a relationship with renowned surgeon and mentor Colin Marlow (Roger Rees), and married but later divorced Owen Hunt (Kevin McKidd).

Oh originally auditioned for the role of Miranda Bailey, although Chandra Wilson was ultimately cast in the part. Oh has received highly positive reviews for her portrayal, with Mark Perigard of the Boston Herald considering her friendship with Meredith to be "the secret-core of Grey's". Oh has also garnered numerous awards and nominations for her role as Yang, including Golden Globe and Screen Actors Guild Award wins in 2006. She was additionally nominated for the Primetime Emmy Award for Outstanding Supporting Actress in a Drama Series each year, from 2005 to 2009. Characterizing the character, ABC noted her competitiveness, ambition, and intelligence as her main traits, while her aggressive and tactless attitude was highlighted as her main weakness. In May 2012, E! Online reported that Oh had signed on for two more years, along with her fellow cast members. Oh left the show after season 10, and her character Cristina Yang was written out of the storyline as a main cast member.

Storylines and character 
Cristina Yang is introduced as a graduate from Stanford University and a fellow surgical intern to Meredith Grey (Ellen Pompeo), Izzie Stevens (Katherine Heigl), Alex Karev (Justin Chambers) and George O'Malley (T.R. Knight); the five of them working under Miranda Bailey (Chandra Wilson). An atheistic competitive intern of Korean-American ancestry, she first desired to become a doctor after a childhood car accident which killed her biological father. Yang also had dyslexia, and was raised in Beverly Hills, California by her mother and supportive Jewish stepfather. She has a B.S. in biochemistry from Smith College, an MD from Stanford University and a Ph.D. from University of California, Berkeley, making her a "double doctor". While her emotional pragmatism, competitive perfectionism, and logical nature lead many to view her as a cutthroat "robot", Cristina hits it off with Meredith on their first day and the pair soon become best-friends and each other's "person", sharing the same "dark and twisty" view of life and sense of humor.

During her internship, Cristina has an on and off relationship with the chief of cardiothoracic surgery Preston Burke (Isaiah Washington) that leads to an accidental pregnancy. Yang schedules an abortion without telling him about the pregnancy due to Burke's behavior towards their lack of relationship status. However, Yang experiences an ectopic pregnancy and Burke discovers the pregnancy after Yang collapses from a burst fallopian tube while in the O.R. Burke and Yang resume their relationship in the aftermath of her miscarriage. Burke gets shot after a "shooting" at the hospital and needs surgery. After Burke is shot in the arm and develops a hand tremor, Yang helps him cover it up by forming a covert partnership wherein she performs most of his surgeries. Yang initially denies involvement during a confrontation, but then confesses everything to Richard Webber (James Pickens Jr.), the chief of surgery. Yang's actions jeopardize Burke's chances of becoming chief, which he views as a huge betrayal. After a short breakup, Yang breaks the silence and Burke proposes marriage, which Yang accepts after eight days of hesitation. When the wedding day comes, Yang has a moment of panic before she is about to walk down the aisle but Burke leaves her because he was not sure if she was ready to commit. Burke then disappears and is not seen again until later in the series. Yang then proceeds to go on her honeymoon to Hawaii with Meredith to recover, returning to discover that Burke has disappeared from her life and transferred to a different hospital.

Burke is replaced by Erica Hahn (Brooke Smith), who immediately dislikes Yang for her trend of having affairs with famous surgeons, such as Burke, going so far as refusing to let her scrub in on cardiac surgeries. Eventually, Callie Torres (Sara Ramirez) moves in with Yang, and she still tries to earn Hahn's approval. Hahn reveals that she dislikes Yang because she reminds her of an early version of herself and continues to cut Yang out of cardiac surgeries and neglects to teach her, before eventually quitting the hospital and leaving Seattle Grace without a head of cardio (due to a disagreement with Torres). Without a teacher, Yang begins to seriously doubt the purpose of remaining in her place at Seattle Grace when the program falls to twelfth on a list of the best teaching hospitals and Burke wins the Harper-Avery award without mentioning her at all, despite her saving his career. Yang tells the Chief that her current existence in the hospital is "unbearable" and that she has turned into a ghost.

Yang meets Owen Hunt (Kevin McKidd), an army trauma surgeon when he patches her up from being stabbed in the stomach by a falling icicle outside the hospital. The pair are immediately attracted to each other and share a brief kiss. Owen Hunt is later honorably discharged, he is hired as Seattle Grace's chief of trauma surgery and he and Yang begin a flirtation. Yang grows emotionally when she decides to support Meredith in her relationship with Derek Shepherd (Patrick Dempsey), despite her logical misgivings about their staying power, and begins to be more emotionally open towards Hunt. However, Hunt has repressed memories of his time in Iraq and PTSD which causes Hunt to behave erratically, and even attack and strangle her while asleep. Yang attempts to be emotionally supportive but ends their relationship as she is afraid of sleeping next to him. Cristina loses her shot at being the first resident to perform a solo surgery despite being unanimously chosen by the attending surgeons, having been disciplined from failing to report the irresponsible behavior of the new interns. Meredith and Cristina have a fight during the intern scandal, and Cristina chooses Alex to be her replacement. They eventually reconcile. When Izzie discovers her life-threatening cancer, Yang is the one she confides in over her other friends due to Yang's ability to remain emotionally distant. Yang saves Izzie's life by coming up with a treatment plan and forcing Izzie to tell their friends of her diagnosis. Hunt begins seeing a therapist, and Yang confesses her love for him. The pair begin a tentative relationship, hampered by Hunt's therapeutic progress and his hot and cold professional behavior, wherein he frequently ignores or penalizes Yang to avoid the appearance of favoritism.

Hunt hires ex-colleague from the Army, Teddy Altman (Kim Raver), to become the chief of cardiothoracic surgery as a "gift" for Yang, after she breaks down over having no new head of cardio. Yang is unimpressed with Altman, neither published nor famous, but her calm proficiency and belief in Yang's skills win her over. A conflict arises in the trio due to Altman and Hunt's repressed feelings for each other. Altman chooses to resign her place as temporary head of cardio because of her feelings for Hunt. Devastated by the blow to her education and the depressing potential of returning to her previous directionless state, Yang begs Altman to stay and teach her, offering Hunt to Altman in exchange. Altman intellectually understands Yang choosing her gift over a man and their relationship is repaired, but Hunt is deeply hurt that Yang traded him away. Hunt subconsciously tries to sabotage Yang's education and the two break up again after Hunt is unable to decide between the two women. After Derek was shot by Gary Clark, a grieving widower who commits mass murder at the hospital, Cristina operates on Derek at gunpoint, thus saving his life. The shooter injures Hunt as well when he chooses to return for Yang over Altman and Grey treats him as Yang saves Grey's husband. Following the attack on the hospital, Yang and Hunt impulsively decide to get married. Yang had severe PTSD and is unable to bear being alone making marriage to Hunt, who understands what she's going through, attractive. Yang spends the early days of her marriage in shock and hiding at Meredith's.

Due to having severe PTSD and being unable to do her job correctly anymore, Cristina quits and begins bartending and eventually throws a housewarming party. Derek helps Cristina emotionally and she ultimately decides to go to work after helping the victim of a school shooting. Yang discovers she is pregnant with Hunt's child and decides to get an abortion. Though Hunt accompanies her to the abortion, he is extremely angry with her decision. Yang then operates on Henry Burton (Scott Foley), Altman's husband, not knowing his identity. When the surgery fails and he dies, Yang is guilt-stricken upon learning of her patient's identity. Altman forgives Yang and forces Yang to realize that she did everything possible. Altman's mentorship of Yang is punishing at times and Altman brutally emphasizes that Yang must learn patience, compassion, and the basics over the flashy surgeries Yang prefers. Altman's tutelage is successful and Yang evolves into an aware and well-rounded surgeon because of it. Altman allows Yang to come up with a wish list of dream surgeries to fulfill before Altman resigns and moves on.

Yang and Hunt distance themselves from each other as they keep fighting over the abortion, despite attending marriage counseling. Hunt has a one-night stand with a patient's friend, leaving Yang heartbroken. She decides to move on, unsure of her future with him. As the end of the fifth year of residency is near, the surgical residents, including Yang, prepare for their medical boards and for the different fellowships they plan on joining. After she passes her exams, Yang reconciles with Hunt and tells him she is leaving Seattle for the Mayo Clinic, Minnesota. Afterward, Yang, Meredith, Shepherd, Arizona Robbins (Jessica Capshaw), Mark Sloan (Eric Dane), and Lexie Grey (Chyler Leigh) are involved in an aviation accident while on the way to Boise, Idaho to perform surgery on conjoined twins. Lexie dies, and Mark later succumbs to his injuries after they are rescued and dies. Following their rescue, Yang, traumatized, has brief reactive psychosis which provokes violent outbursts and makes her unresponsive. Yang leaves Seattle to become a cardiothoracic surgical fellow and goes, as planned, to the Mayo Clinic, but has difficulties adapting to her new colleagues' way of working. While in Minnesota, Yang develops a friendship with a near-retirement cardio surgeon, Craig Thomas (William Daniels). She mainly teases him with comments regarding his old age. She also begins an affair with the head of surgery Dr. Parker (Steven Culp) who has issues with Thomas. After Thomas dies from a heart attack, Yang returns to Seattle.

Cristina is re-hired and Owen asks for a divorce once Cristina wants to reconcile. Shocked, Cristina agrees, but later finds out that the potential conflict of interest regarding the plane crash lawsuit was a key motive behind Owen's request and confronts him. Owen tells her that he 'feels responsible' and was worried as he thought she was dead. They have a sexual relationship after divorcing. The hospital is sued and found guilty of negligence. The surviving doctors, including Yang, must receive $15 million of compensation each, which leads the hospital to a near-bankruptcy as the insurers refuse to pay. Yang, Callie Torres (Sara Ramirez), and the other surviving doctors buy the hospital with the help of the Harper-Avery Foundation to prevent it from closing, and each become members of the new directing board. After buying the hospital, Yang realizes that she was made for the O.R. and breaks things off with Owen because he still wants kids and she still does not.

After breaking up with Owen, Cristina continues to excel at surgery and becomes de facto chief of cardio. Although supportive of Meredith's choice to become a mother, Cristina points out the fact that it has hurt Meredith's career and clinical judgment. This causes a wedge in their friendship. Grey attempts to catch up professionally with a research trial, but the divide widens when Cristina's trial overshadows Grey's and steals Grey's resources. When Dr. Shane Ross, a second-year resident, stands up to Meredith for her, Cristina kisses him, and later begins sleeping with him, as well as becoming his mentor and passing on the skills learned from Altman. Cristina's project is immensely successful, and she is informed that she could be considered for the Harper Avery award from her 3-D printing of a heart conduit. Grey and Yang reconcile when Grey acknowledges that Yang is correct, she has surpassed Grey, and that Grey is jealous of Yang's professional freedom and success, while her own is hampered by her family.

Cristina is nominated for the Harper Avery award and is a strong candidate, however she is passed over due to her relationship with the Harper-Avery Foundation, that co-owns Grey-Sloan Memorial Hospital. Cristina goes to speak at a hospital in Zurich, Switzerland, orchestrated by Preston Burke who built his own hospital following his winning of the Harper Avery. He offers Cristina his job as the head of the hospital so that he can spend more time with his wife and kids.

Cristina accepts the offer and interviews candidates for her replacement position at the hospital, including Maggie Pierce for the new chief of cardio. Cristina transfers her hospital shares to Alex Karev and recommends he take over her seat on the board.

At the end of season 10, she says goodbye to her co-workers she has come to know and love including Owen, Derek and Meredith. Cristina and Meredith share special moments reminiscing about all the horrors they went through and dancing it out one last time. Cristina leaves for Zurich with surgical intern Shane Ross, who chooses to leave in order to study under her in Switzerland where she now owns a research hospital. There, Cristina thrives as the new owner.

In season 16, Meredith gets text messages from Cristina saying she has given her a "gift". At the conclusion of the episode we find that the gift from Yang was the new pediatric surgeon Cormac Hayes (Richard Flood), who becomes a new love interest for Meredith.

Development

Casting & Creation

On the creation of Yang, Shonda Rhimes said the character contained "a little bit of [her] personality". Speaking with talk show host Oprah Winfrey, Rhimes said: "Cristina was second, simply because she's the kind of woman I know really well, and I like her. There's something interesting about a person who is that driven, a little bit emotionally disconnected but still a caring, sweet, and smart individual you could be friends with." Sandra Oh, initially auditioned for the character of Bailey, adding: "Thank God I did not get that part", explaining the show would not be the same without fellow cast member, Wilson. Discussing casting Oh as Yang, Rhimes said: "She brought this energy that felt very fresh. From the beginning, I've been shaping Cristina around Sandra a little bit. One of my favorite things to do is take as much of her dialogue out of a scene as possible because she does so much nonverbally. Then I just watch what she manages to do without having a word to say."

The character of Yang was not originally supposed to be of Asian descent. Oh said her character was "a pert little blonde and the thing is the woman who runs the show, Shonda Rhimes, is a black woman, which makes a big fucking difference." In 2009, when asked why Oh signed on for Grey's Anatomy, Oh said:
 "I'm very proud of this show and I think it came along at the right time for me. It's a changing time on television because 5 or 10 years ago you wouldn't have a major network show where half of the cast were not white." Oh's original contract with the show expired after season 8, however, E! Online reported in May 2012, that Oh, as well as all original cast members, had signed on for 2 more years.

Characterization
The American Broadcasting Company (ABC) characterized Yang as "competitive", "ambitious", and "intelligent", while also noting her weaknesses: "bossy", "aggressive", and "tactless". Oh said of her character: "I've always tried to play Cristina with a tremendous amount of focus and ambition—which is the reality for a female surgeon. I mean, in real life there aren't many of them. But the ones you encounter are at the very top of their game. You have to have a kind of ascetic personality to survive." James Pickens Jr. who portrays Dr. Webber said: "That character itself set a bar in terms of how we look at millennial women: independent yet vulnerable, seriously competitive yet caring." Rhimes referred to Yang's relationship with Burke by the portmanteau "Burktina", citing "Losing My Religion" as one of her favorite episodes featuring them because it shows their evolution from the beginning of the second season to its end. 

Rhimes commented, "[We see] her struggle to suppress all of her humanity in pursuit of perfection. And in my mind, what we realize is that she is not cold. She is terrified. Scared that if she lets her emotions out, they will overtake her and she will be hurt. And you can't hate her. Because it's so incredibly human and understandable." Yang's friendship with Meredith has been looked upon as "sisterhood", and Yang has repeatedly referred to the former as "her person". This led to the two being dubbed "the twisted sisters". At the conclusion of season three, the duo went on a "honeymoon" together, and Rhimes called it her favorite detail of the finale.

New York magazine wrote of the character: "There's probably no woman on TV right now more single-mindedly dedicated to her career than Cristina. It has long been her defining characteristic. If it occasionally makes her into a caricature, it has also unquestionably established that she would have an abortion in this circumstance." Talking about Yang's abortion in the eighth season, Rhimes explained she intended Yang to have an abortion already in the second season but changed it with an ectopic pregnancy at the suggestion of one of her writers because  "that was so much more interesting, story-wise". As for the abortion in the eighth season, Rhimes commented: "I really wanted Cristina Yang to stay true to who Cristina Yang is. And I feel like that is a character who has never really wanted to be a mother. The idea that this woman would have a child that she did not want and resented for ruining her career and resented Owen for making her have [it] would have been hideous. [The abortion] made sense for the character."

Discussing his onscreen relationship with Yang, McKidd said: "It's not going to be easy for them. What I read when I read the season premiere, and this is just my take on it, is that it was very much two very analytical people, Owen and Cristina. They're very similar in a way, I think, as people. Two analytical people see each other over a crowded ER room and their eyes meet." On the topic of Yang's triumphs and challenges in the eighth season, Oh said: "It has been an extremely challenging year that has had a lot of ups and downs, both challenging and exhilarating. We would shoot all our scenes for a day or two straight, and that was extremely challenging because emotionally and physically it becomes really exhausting."

Oh said of Yang's expressions of emotions during season eight: "You see her express her emotions with only two people: her best-friend Meredith and her husband Owen. To see someone being pulled apart so intensely, which honestly most everyone goes through in their life in some ways, if you're lucky you're completely pulled apart and then you have to pull yourself together, which hopefully will be the exploration within hopefully the next season." Although the characters' marriage is tested, McKidd reported to The Hollywood Reporter: "I think they're meant for each other. I hold out faith in Cristina and Owen, even though they go to the darkest places out of all the couples on the show. It's going to get worse but it's going to get better soon."

Reception

Reviews

The character received positive reviews from critics at the time of its inception and as the series went on the reviews turned to high acclaim and Yang went on the become an iconic character not just for Grey's, but for television itself. Kelli Catana of The Huffington Post named Yang "the best damn character" of the series. Yang appeared in Comcast's list of TV's Most Intriguing Characters, with the website commenting that she is "an engaging yet comedic factor for the prime-time soap Grey's Anatomy." Philadelphia Magazine included Yang in its list of the "10 Best Doctors on Television". However, the same periodical listed her as one of "The 12 Most Annoying Women on TV". Mark Perigard of the Boston Herald considers her friendship with Meredith to be "the secret core of Grey's and perhaps creator Shonda Rhimes' greatest contribution to primetime." The Huffington Post writer Kelli Catana agreed, saying: "the Meredith Grey/Cristina Yang relationship is probably the most true friendship on network television." Their friendship was listed in AOL TV's "Top 20: TV's Best BFFs" and in Entertainment Weekly "30 Best TV Bromances/Gal Pals". Yahoo! Voices also put Yang on their list of "The Most Loyal TV best-friends of All Time". Television Without Pity writer Lauren Shotwell claimed Yang is "the only one of these five [residents] that regularly acts like an actual doctor".

Yang's relationship with Burke was highly acclaimed; it was considered "one of the most interesting relationships on the show". Similarly, The Orange County Register wrote that their romance became "one of the most touching and funny attractions of Grey's Anatomy." Christopher Monfette of IGN was critical of their wedding planning in the third season, saying: "The will-they's and won't-they's fly and fall like hobbled pigeons until the season finale when the show solves both its personal and professional problems in the most obvious and least compelling of ways." UGO.com placed their break-up on its list of The Most Horrible TV Breakups. In 2009, Monfette said of Yang's relationship with Owen: "[Hunt's] interactions with Cristina were perfectly balanced for optimum drama, never together and never apart for so long that the back-and-forth became frustrating. Viewers could clearly see a softening of the typically hard-edged Cristina, a pleasant change for what had become something of a one-note character."

Jennifer Armstrong of Entertainment Weekly also praised the pairing, especially in "Elevator Love Letter", saying: "As good as they've been at amping up the romance crackling between Cristina and Owen, Sandra Oh and Kevin McKidd brought the Emmy consideration tonight from scene 1." She also added: "I loved seeing Cristina at least try to stand by her man." Of Yang and Hunt's wedding, Armstrong said: "Glad we made a clean disposal of the Cristina-Owen-Teddy love-triangle, though, when he quipped to Teddy, "I heard there's a guy," and she said she was happy for him." She also praised Owen's proposal scene, giving it an "A". Later, she praised their marriage, saying: "I am absolutely loving the stronger-than-ever lady-bond between these two this season. Is it because they're both married now? Just growing up? Whatever, it's the opposite of Blair and Serena's annoyingly fickle frenemy status on Gossip Girl, and I can't get enough."

New York Magazine praised the abortion storyline, saying that the show "was brave enough to do what almost no other series will: show this one particular, totally legal medical procedure on TV" and that the abortion was "the only plausible resolution" for Yang's pregnancy. Tanner Stransky, also of Entertainment Weekly, said of Yang's actions after Owen's affair: "It alternately seems silly and not silly, when you really think about it." Robert Bianco of USA Today praised Yang's storylines in the eighth season, saying: "Their stories are effectively tied into that of a patient whose ability to move forward is complicated by a complex response to a hideous past." HitFix writer Liane Bonin Starr applauded Yang's brief departure from Seattle Grace to Mayo Clinic in the ninth season, which was "interesting" as "it showed us a new side of her—and after so many seasons, that was some welcome insight."

The relationship between Meredith and Cristina has been highly acclaimed and been a highlight of the show. Mark Perigard of the Boston Herald considered the friendship to be "the secret-core of Grey's". Aisha Harris of Slate called their relation The Best Female Friendship on TV adding that "With those two characters, showrunner Shonda Rhimes and her team of writers created one of the most nuanced and realistic portrayals of female friendship on television." Samantha Highfill of Entertainment Weekly called Meredith and Cristina the best female friends on TV because "they don't try to be". There's nothing fake about them, which is a rarity in how female friends are portrayed on television. She further went on to call them 'soulmate', "And even though they'd never dare get sappy enough to say it, they're soulmates. Margaret Lyons of Vulture called the friendship "dream-BFF-relationship." and the primary focus of the show, "One of the series' calling-cards has been its depiction of female friendship and particularly the primacy that friendship enjoyed over romantic relationships."

E! at the time of Sandra Oh's exit wrote, "In Grey's Anatomys 10-year history, the doctor-duo has been through a lot together: weddings, deaths, drownings, plane-crashes, bomb-threats, shootings, you name it, they've lived (and danced) through it." and added, "And with the 3 words, "You're My Person", Meredith Grey and Cristina Yang solidified their status as the small screen's best best-friends ever."

Awards

Oh has received numerous awards and nominations for her portrayal of Yang. In 2005, she was nominated for the Primetime Emmy Award for Outstanding Supporting Actress in a Drama Series, which she was nominated for every year until 2009. Also in 2005, she was nominated for Best Supporting Actress – Series, Miniseries or Television Film at the 10th Satellite Awards. The next year, the cast won the Satellite Award for Best Cast – Television Series. In 2006, Oh won the award for Best Supporting Actress – Series, Miniseries or Television Film at the 63rd Golden Globe Awards. In 2006, the cast was nominated for the Screen Actors Guild Award for Outstanding Performance by an Ensemble in a Drama Series, which they won in 2007, and were nominated for again the following year. Also at the 12th Screen Actors Guild Awards, Oh won the award for Outstanding Performance by a Female Actor in a Drama Series. In 2010, Oh was nominated for Outstanding Actress in a Drama Series at the 41st NAACP Image Awards, which she was nominated for again in 2012, and in 2011, she was nominated for Outstanding Supporting Actress in a Drama Series at the 42nd NAACP Image Awards. In 2011, Oh was nominated for Favorite TV Drama Actress and Favorite TV Doctor at the 37th People's Choice Awards an award she was nominated again for three years later at the 40th People's Choice Awards and also the subsequent year at the 41st People's Choice Awards. She was also nominated alongside Pompeo for the Favorite TV Gal Pals category.

References 
Specific

General

External links 
Cristina Yang at ABC.com

Fictional American Jews
Fictional feminists and women's rights activists
Fictional characters from Beverly Hills, California
Television characters introduced in 2005
Fictional surgeons
Grey's Anatomy characters
Fictional characters with dyslexia
Fictional female doctors
Fictional Jewish women
Atheism in television
American female characters in television
Fictional cardiothoracic surgeons
Fictional Korean American people